Pooja Phalam is a 1964 Indian Telugu-language drama film directed and co-written by B. N. Reddy. It stars Akkineni Nageswara Rao, Savitri and Jamuna, with music composed by S. Rajeswara Rao. The film is based on the novel Poojari, written by Munipalle Raju.

Plot
Madhu is a Zamindar who is a very gullible person and everyone laughs at him. Once he meets a beautiful girl, Vasanthi who stays in a portion of his house. Vasanthi becomes very friendly and behaves very close with Madhu. Here Madhu mistakes her friendly nature as love. But Vasanthi treats her just like a brother. Meanwhile, Madhu has to leaves to Madras for higher studies where he gets acquaintance with a person Sriram and both of them become close friends. He writes many letters to Vasanthi, but he never gets any reply. When he returns, he finds out Vasanthi and her family left the city without telling anybody. Madhu finds a letter from which he realizes that Vasanthi only saw him as a brother. He gets very depressed and falls sick. Seetha, daughter of his Manager Ramakrishnaiah takes care of Madhu and gives him company. After some time, he recovers from the depression and starts loving Seeta. Parallelly, Govindaiah coparcenary to Madhu's grandfather claims a case in the court that Madhu's property belongs to him. The court handovers the property until the judgment is issued. So, Madhu has to leave his mansion when Ramakrishnaiah gives him shelter. After some time, Madhu is almost in the edge to win the case. Distressed, Govindaiah tries to kill Madhu by making an accident in which he loses his memory. Now Sriram becomes a mental specialist and he strives to regain his friend's memory but could not succeed. Anyway, Madhu wins the case, Govindaiah is arrested and he is taken to his mansion where he slightly remembers memories of Vasanthi. Sriram, Ramakrishnaiah, and everyone is in search of her but fails. Favorably, Vasanthi is married to Sriram and through her words, he discovers the truth. At last, Sriram brings Vasanthi and makes Madhu to regains his sanity. Finally, the movie ends on a happy note with the marriage of Madhu and Seeta.

Cast
Akkineni Nageswara Rao as Madhu
Savitri as Seeta
Jamuna as Vasanthi
Jaggayya as Sriram
Gummadi as Ramakrishnaiah
Relangi as Govinda Rao
Ramana Reddy as Govindaiah
Mikkilineni as Bheemudu
Peketi Sivaram as Nityanandam
Potti Prasad as Raja
L. Vijayalakshmi as Neela Nagini
Rajasree as Rani
Hemalatha as Vasanthi's mother
Chhaya Devi

Soundtrack

Music composed by S. Rajeswara Rao.

References

External links
 

1960s Telugu-language films
1964 films
Films based on Indian novels
Films scored by S. Rajeswara Rao
Indian black-and-white films
Indian drama films
Films directed by B. N. Reddy